Little Joe may refer to:

People
 Little Joe McLerran (born 1983), American singer, guitarist and recording artist
 Joe Arenas (born 1925), American retired National Football League player
 Little Joe Blue (1934–1990), American blues singer and guitarist, born Joseph Valery, Jr.
 Little Joe Cook (1922–2014), American R&B singer and songwriter
 Joe Dallesandro (born 1948), American actor and counterculture icon, associated with Andy Warhol and Lou Reed
 Joseph DeFede (1934–2012), New York City mob boss turned informant
 Joe Hamilton (basketball) (born 1948), American retired basketball player
 "Little Joe" Hupp, a member of the 1960s rock band The Smoke Ring
 Joe Morgan (1943–2020), American Major League Baseball player
 Joe Pavelski (born 1984), American National Hockey League player
 Joe Presko (born 1928), American retired Major League Baseball pitcher
 Joe Washington (born 1953), American retired National Football League player
 Joe Weatherly (1922–1964), American stock car racing driver
 Joseph Wentworth, early 20th century American college football player and coach
 Joe Yeager (1875–1937), American Major League Baseball player
 Ring name of Joe Acton (1852–1917), British professional wrestler and world champion
 Little Joe (singer) (born 1940), stage name of American tejano performer José María De León Hernández
 Ranking Joe (born 1959), also known as Little Joe, Jamaican reggae DJ Joseph Jackson
 J.O.E. (1986–2011), Jamaican reggae singer formerly known as 'Lil Joe' or 'Little Joe'
 Little Papa Joe (born 1935),  American blues guitarist and singer
 Little Son Joe (1900-1961), American blues guitarist and composer

Arts and entertainment

Fictional characters
 Little Joe (character), Joseph, the youngest Cartwright son in the television series Bonanza
 Little Joe (Veggietales), a Veggietales character
 Little Joe Jackson, the protagonist of the 1940 Broadway musical Cabin in the Sky and the 1943 film Cabin in the Sky
 Little Joe, in Team Umizoomi
 A character in the 1970 film Kelly's Heroes
 The title character of "Little Joe the Wrangler", an American cowboy song

Other arts and entertainment
 Little Joe (comic strip), a Western comic strip created in the early 1930s by Ed Leffingwell 
 Little Joe (film), a 2019 British-Austrian drama film
 "Little Joe", a track from the album Screaming Life by Soundgarden

Places
 Mount Little Joe, Victoria, Australia - see Warburton, Victoria
 Little Joe River, Minnesota

Rockets and missiles
 KAN Little Joe, a US Navy surface-to-air missile
 Little Joe (rocket), a 1959 booster rocket used in the US Mercury space program
 Little Joe II, used in the US Apollo space program

Locomotives
 Little Joe (Baltimore and Ohio locomotive), the last 0-4-0 steam locomotives built for the Baltimore and Ohio Railroad
 Little Joe (electric locomotive), a type of railroad electric locomotive

Other uses
 Nickname for four in a game of craps
 Little Joe's, a former Italian restaurant (1928–1998) in Los Angeles, California

Lists of people by nickname